Draginja Vlasić (January 1928 in Vojka – 20 October 2011 in Zemun) is a Serbian painter.

Biography 
Vlašić was born in the village Vojka in Srem, the southern part of Vojvodina. She attended primary and grade school in Vojka and Stara Pazova, the nearest city to her birthplace. She graduated from Gymnasium in Zemun. In the year 1952, she starts studies of mathematics at the Faculty of Natural Sciences and Mathematics, University of Belgrade, and at the same time The Academy of Fine Arts. She quits the studies of Mathematics and graduates Academy of Fine Arts 1954. in the class of Zora Petrović and master's degree at the same professor in 1956.

Short time, after studies she works as an Art professor in high school, but recently she quits a steady job and dedicates completely to her artistic work. In the last three decades of her life, due to severe illness, she lived far from publicity in her atelier in Zemun where in spite of her illness she worked almost to the very end of her life.

She died in the City of Zemun.

Painting 
Thematic of her paintings is mostly, and in the best strength expressed in her compositions with acts, usually of large size, reaching even dimensions larger than 3 X 3 meters. They are followed by less portraits, and, very rarely presenting landscapes and other themes presented in smaller sizes. In her huge compositions there are not details or precise painting. On a contrary. They seem like huge colored krokies in which the very stroke is adequate to a picture dimension. Her strokes are broad and free, mark the shapes just slightly, so the painting exists only in color values and in a strong suggestion of movement. The symbolist vision is strongly confirmed in over dimensioned paintings, where tendencies of senses offers to observer lot of different approaches to the meanings.
She was a member of "ULUS" and "LADA"

Exhibitions 
 Exhibition pavilion "Masarikova 4", Belgrade 1959.
 The channel Dunav - Tisa - Dunav Maisson, Novi Sad 1960.
 Museum of Eastern Bosnia, Tuzla 1962.
 The Belgrade culture center gallery, Belgrade 1964.
 The Air force HQ building, Zemun 1974.
 Theatre "Atelier 212" 1974.
 The Public Theatre, Zemun 1981.
 The Pinky gallery, Zemun 1984.

1928 births
2011 deaths
Serbian painters